Kustaa is a Finnish masculine name derived from Gustav. Notable people named Kustaa include:

Arvo Kustaa Halberg (1910–2000), leader of the Communist Party USA
Kaarlo Kustaa Lappalainen (1877–1965), Finnish sport shooter
Kalle Kustaa Paasia (1883–1961), Finnish gymnast who competed in the 1908 Summer Olympics
Kustaa Pihlajamäki (1902–1944), Finnish freestyle wrestler and Olympic champion
Kustaa Rovio (1887–1938), Finnish Communist politician who fled to the Russian SFSR after the Finnish Civil War

Finnish masculine given names